The Minuteman Missile National Historic Site is an American national historic site established in 1999 near Wall, South Dakota to illustrate the history and significance of the Cold War, the arms race, and intercontinental ballistic missile (ICBM) development. The site preserves the last intact Minuteman II ICBM system in the United States, in a disarmed and demilitarized status. Guided tours are available of the underground Launch Control Center, and a missile silo can be observed from above. Some 450 of the newer Minuteman III missiles are still on active duty at Malmstrom AFB, Montana, Minot AFB, North Dakota, and F. E. Warren AFB, Wyoming.

Facilities
This National Historic Site consists of three facilities: a visitor center and two significant Cold War-era sites, a launch control center and a missile silo/launch facility, formerly operated by the 66th Strategic Missile Squadron of the 44th Strategic Missile Wing, headquartered at Ellsworth Air Force Base in Box Elder, near Rapid City.

The silo, known as launch facility Delta Nine (D-09) was constructed in 1963. An unarmed missile is on display inside. The launch tube's 90-ton cover has been rolled partly away and welded to the rails it rides on. The launch tube was then covered with a glass viewing enclosure. Not only does this permit visitors to see the missile, it enables Russian satellites to verify that the site is not operational, and hence in compliance with the Strategic Arms Reduction Treaty. Visitors can conduct self-guided tours of the site during the day by calling a number on their cell phones and walking around the site, listening to the description of various points over the phone.

It consists of an above-ground building containing a kitchen, sleeping quarters, offices and life-support equipment. Guided tours are conducted underground here, but are limited to six people at a time due to the very small underground launch control center ("capsule") and are a half-hour long. Self-guided tours are not possible here; the gate for the fence around D-01 is always locked, just like it was when it was an active launch control facility.

History
The complex, one of six located in the central United States, was built as a deterrent to a nuclear first strike by the Soviet Union. By placing missiles underground in widely separated locations, it was hoped that regardless of the size of a Soviet missile attack, enough US missiles would survive to ensure devastation on the aggressor nation. The Minutemen in this complex remained on alert for nearly 30 years until the wing was deactivated following the signing of the Strategic Arms Reduction Treaty (START) by President George Bush and Soviet leader Mikhail Gorbachev in 1991. Under the terms of the treaty, the missiles in this complex were removed from their silos, and in 1994 the 44th Missile Wing was deactivated. All sites in the complex, except D-01 and D-09, have been destroyed.

D-01 and D-09 were candidates for becoming a national historic site for a few reasons:
 close to a major road (Interstate 90)
 close to existing recreational facilities (Badlands National Park, Mount Rushmore)
 the sites saw limited modification since they were built in the 1960s (true of all sites in the 44th Strategic Missile Wing).

The Minuteman Missile National Historic Site Boundary Modification Act (S. 459; 113th Congress) added about 29 acres of land to the park in 2013, tripling its size to include a visitor facility. Most of it was transferred from the adjacent Buffalo Gap National Grassland.

Gallery

See also
 List of museums in South Dakota
 Ronald Reagan Minuteman Missile State Historic Site
 Titan Missile Museum
 Quebec-One Missile Alert Facility
 Strategic Air and Space Museum – Museum collection includes Minuteman II, Minuteman III, and Titan II re-entry vehicle shrouds and launch control systems on display.
 Strategic missile forces museum in Ukraine – Similar museum in the former Soviet Union

References

External links

National Park Service, Minuteman Missile National Historic Site
Minuteman Missile National Historic Site: Protecting a Legacy of the Cold War , a National Park Service Teaching with Historic Places (TwHP) lesson plan
Aviation: From Sand Dunes to Sonic Booms, a National Park Service Discover Our Shared Heritage Travel Itinerary

, the Delta launch control center
, the Delta-Nine silo

Aerospace museums in South Dakota
Badlands National Park
Cold War museums in the United States
Launch complexes of the United States Space Force
Military and war museums in South Dakota
Museums in Jackson County, South Dakota
National Historic Sites in South Dakota
Protected areas of Jackson County, South Dakota
Protected areas of Pennington County, South Dakota
Historic American Engineering Record in South Dakota
Protected areas established in 1999
1999 establishments in South Dakota
Military facilities on the National Register of Historic Places in South Dakota
National Register of Historic Places in Jackson County, South Dakota
National Register of Historic Places in Pennington County, South Dakota